Iduna (minor planet designation: 176 Iduna) is a large main-belt asteroid that was discovered by German-American astronomer Christian Heinrich Friedrich Peters on October 14, 1877, in Clinton, New York. It is named after Sällskapet Idun, a club in Stockholm that hosted an astronomical conference; Idun (Iðunn, Iduna) is also a Norse goddess. A G-type asteroid, it has a composition similar to that of the largest main-belt asteroid, 1 Ceres.

An occultation of a star by Iduna was observed from Mexico on January 17, 1998.

Photometric observations of this asteroid at the Romer Observatory in Aarhus, Denmark during 1996 gave a light curve with a period of 11.289 ± 0.006 hours and a brightness variation of 0.35 in magnitude. A 2008 study at the Palmer Divide Observatory in Colorado Springs, Colorado gave a period of 11.309 ± 0.005 hours, confirming the 1996 result.

References

External links 
 Lightcurve plot of 176 Iduna, Palmer Divide Observatory, B. D. Warner (2007)
 Asteroid Lightcurve Database (LCDB), query form (info )
 Dictionary of Minor Planet Names, Google books
 Asteroids and comets rotation curves, CdR – Observatoire de Genève, Raoul Behrend
 Discovery Circumstances: Numbered Minor Planets (1)-(5000) – Minor Planet Center
 
 

Background asteroids
Iduna
Iduna
G-type asteroids (Tholen)
Ch-type asteroids (SMASS)
18771014
Objects observed by stellar occultation